North Blackwood is a locality of the Shire of Hepburn, Victoria, Australia.

North Blackwood Post Office opened on 10 August 1909, was renamed Waldron in 1910 and closed in that year.

This town is not to be confused with Barrys Reef.

References

Towns in Victoria (Australia)